Sheldon Stryker (1924–2016) was an American sociologist. Born in St. Paul, Minnesota, on May 26, 1924, Stryker was raised by his grandfather and his aunts after his mother died. He sought to enlist in the United States Army in 1942, but was rejected due to bad vision. Stryker was drafted and became a combat medic the next year. After World War II ended, he enrolled at the University of Minnesota to study social work. Stryker changed his major to sociology later completed a doctorate in the subject at UM in 1955. He taught at Indiana University, Bloomington from 1950 to 2002. Stryker served as editor in chief of Social Psychology Quarterly from 1967 to 1969, and assumed an equivalent role for the American Sociological Review between 1982 and 1986. He died on May 4, 2016, in Sarasota, Florida, aged 91, of surgical complications.

References

1924 births
2016 deaths
American sociologists
Academic journal editors
University of Minnesota College of Liberal Arts alumni
Indiana University Bloomington faculty
People from Saint Paul, Minnesota
American Sociological Review editors
Social Psychology Quarterly editors
United States Army personnel of World War II